Tanjung Piandang (Chinese: 角头) is a small town and mukim in Kerian District, Perak, Malaysia.

Geography
The mukim consists of 15,696 residents and spans over an area of 40.76 km2.

Economy
Its primary economic activities include fishing and paddy farming.

References

Kerian District
Mukims of Perak
Towns in Perak